Sheena Sharese Moore (born October 23, 1984) is an American professional basketball player. She plays at the point guard position. With ŽKK Partizan she won 2 national championships (2009–10, 2010–11) and national cup (2010–11).

UNLV  statistics
Source

References

External links
 Profile at unlvrebels.com
 Profile at fibaeurope.com
Profile at eurobasket.com

1984 births
Living people
Sportspeople from Lansing, Michigan
American women's basketball players
Point guards
ŽKK Partizan players
Basketball players from Michigan
21st-century American women